Al-Wydad Sport Club, is an Iraqi football team based in Wasit, that plays in Iraq Division Three.

Managerial history
 Sajjad Mahmoud

See also 
 2021–22 Iraq FA Cup

References

External links
 Al-Wydad SC on Goalzz.com
 Iraq Clubs- Foundation Dates

2003 establishments in Iraq
Association football clubs established in 2003
Football clubs in Wasit